Robert Emile Francis (born December 5, 1958) is a Canadian-born American former professional ice hockey player and coach. He played 14 games in the National Hockey League with the Detroit Red Wings during the 1982–83 season, though most of his career was spent in the minor leagues. He was the head coach of the Phoenix Coyotes of the from June 1999 to February 2004. In 2002 Francis became the first Coyotes' coach to win the Jack Adams Award. He is the son of former NHL general manager and coach Emile Francis.

Coaching career
Francis served as a player-coach with the Salt Lake Golden Eagles of the International Hockey League (IHL) in 1986, followed by four years as head coach of the IHL's Utah Grizzlies. After head coaching stints in the American Hockey League (AHL) for the Saint John Flames and Providence Bruins, Francis spent two years at the NHL level as an assistant coach to Pat Burns of the Boston Bruins before being hired by the Phoenix Coyotes in 1999. In 2002, after leading the Coyotes to a 40-27-9-6 record, and the most points in the league following that year's Olympic break, Francis was awarded the Jack Adams Award as Coach of the Year. Midway through his fifth season at the helm of the Coyotes in 2004, Francis was fired after a slow start and replaced by assistant coach Rick Bowness.

On April 26, 2006, Francis signed a two year-contract to coach HIFK in the Finnish SM-liiga. On December 19, 2006, Francis's contract was terminated.

Personal life
Although Francis was born in North Battleford, Saskatchewan, he spent much of his youth growing up in Long Beach, New York, while his father was coaching the New York Rangers, and holds both Canadian and American citizenship. In September 2012, it was revealed that Francis had lost his balance and equilibrium and required a walker to get around. The symptoms began showing during the 2003–04 NHL season. Francis also revealed his struggle with alcoholism, which played a key factor in his dismissal from HIFK.

Career statistics

Regular season and playoffs

NHL coaching

References

External links
 

1958 births
Living people
Adirondack Red Wings players
American men's ice hockey centers
American ice hockey coaches
Arizona Coyotes coaches
Birmingham Bulls (CHL) players
Boston Bruins coaches
Canadian expatriate ice hockey players in the United States
Canadian ice hockey centres
Canadian ice hockey coaches
Colorado Flames players
Detroit Red Wings players
Ice hockey coaches from New York (state)
Ice hockey people from Saskatchewan
Ice hockey players from New York (state)
Jack Adams Award winners
Muskegon Mohawks players
New Hampshire Wildcats men's ice hockey players
Oklahoma City Stars players
People from Long Beach, New York
Sportspeople from North Battleford
Providence Bruins coaches
Salt Lake Golden Eagles (IHL) players
Undrafted National Hockey League players